Dawlat Khatun was the 12th ruler of the Khorshidi dynasty in Little Lorestan in Persia in 1316. 

She was married to Izz al-Din Muhammad bin Izz al-Din. After the death of her spouse in 1316, she succeeded to the throne herself. However, she was reportedly a poor administrator "who was not successful in managing the affairs of state", and therefore abdicated in favour of her brother-in-law 'Izz al-Din Hasan.

References

 Mernissi, Fatima; Mary Jo Lakeland (2003). The forgotten queens of Islam. Oxford University Press. .

History of Lorestan Province
14th-century Iranian people
14th-century women rulers